Keith Collin (18 January 1937 – 6 March 1991) was a British diver who won the gold medal in the Men's  springboard diving at the 1958 British Empire and Commonwealth Games and competed at the 1960 Summer Olympics.

Career
At the age of 21 Collin completed for England at the 1958 British Empire and Commonwealth Games, which was hosted in Wales. He competed in the Men's  springboard diving, and edged out Bill Patrick from Canada to win the gold medal by 126.78 points to 124.62.

At the 1960 Summer Olympics, Collin placed in 26th place in the Men's  springboard, scoring 46.10 points but failing to qualify for the final. He was the only competitor entered from the British team.

In 1962 he represented England in the 3 metres springboard at the 1962 British Empire and Commonwealth Games in Perth, Australia.

References

1937 births
1991 deaths
Sportspeople from London
British male divers
Olympic divers of Great Britain
Divers at the 1960 Summer Olympics
Divers at the 1958 British Empire and Commonwealth Games
Commonwealth Games medallists in diving
Commonwealth Games gold medallists for England
20th-century British people
Medallists at the 1958 British Empire and Commonwealth Games